TJ McKenna is a former Democratic member of the Missouri House of Representatives, serving from 2013 to 2015. He represented part of Jefferson County, including the cities of Festus and Crystal City. In 2013, McKenna voted for a bill that attempted to nullify federal gun control laws.

References

External links
 
Legislative website

Living people
Democratic Party members of the Missouri House of Representatives
1985 births
University of Missouri alumni
Politicians from St. Louis
People from Festus, Missouri